Benjamin Lapeyre (born 24 September 1986 in Castres) is a French rugby union player. His position is Fullback, although he can also play as a Wing. He currently plays for CA Brive in the French Top 14.

References

External links
ItsRugby profile

1986 births
Living people
People from Castres
French rugby union players
RC Toulonnais players
Rugby union fullbacks
Sportspeople from Tarn (department)
SC Albi players
Racing 92 players
Stade Rochelais players
CA Brive players